is a Japanese fashion model who is represented by Newpower. She produced fashion brands and appeared in the music industry. Her ex-husband is actor Eisaku Yoshida.

Filmography

TV series

References

External links
 Official profile 
  

Japanese female models
1971 births
Living people
People from Tokyo
Models from Tokyo Metropolis